Anne Lesage (born June 12, 1969) is a French engineer who is a group leader at the French National Centre for Scientific Research. She is based at the High Field NMR Centre of the Lyon Institute of Analytical Sciences, where she develops novel nuclear magnetic resonance approaches to characterise solid-state materials.

Early life and education 
Lesage completed her undergraduate degree in engineering at the École Centrale Paris. She moved to the Pierre and Marie Curie University for graduate studies, where she earned a master's degree in biophysics in 1992. Lesage moved to Lyon for doctoral research, where she used NMR to investigate the COL1-NC1 junction.

Research and career 
In 1994, Lesage joined the French National Centre for Scientific Research, where she started working at the École normale supérieure de Lyon. She has worked on high-field dynamic nuclear polarisation solid-state nuclear magnetic resonance. In such an experiment, the polarisation of unpaired electrons is transferred to nuclei that are close by. This enhances the signal by an amount proportional to the gyromagnetic ratio of the electron and the polarised nucleus. The technique has been improved since the 1990s, including the development of advanced equipment and design of stable sources of polarisation (organic radicals). Solid-state nuclear magnetic resonance can provide information about structure-property relationships in emerging materials, and Lesage has shown that by making use of dynamic nuclear polarization signal intensity can be improved and porous and non-porous materials characterised. The technique, DNP Surface Enhanced NMR Spectroscopy (DNP SENS), involves combining a free radical into a material (e.g. via the addition of few drops of polarising solution). This polarisation is transferred to the protons of solvent under irradiation with microwaves, and to surface protons via proton spin diffusion. DNP SENS has application in the characterisation of nanomaterials for advanced technologies and in the characterisation of complex pharmarceuticals.

Awards 
 2010 French National Centre for Scientific Research Cristal Medal
 2010 Medal of the Ecole Normale Supérieure de Lyon
 2017 Elected International Society of Magnetic Resonance Fellow
 2018 French Academy of Sciences Prix Jaffé
 2018 French Academy of Sciences Berthelot medal

Selected publications

References 

French women engineers
1969 births
Living people
French National Centre for Scientific Research scientists
École Centrale Paris alumni
Pierre and Marie Curie University alumni
Academic staff of the École Normale Supérieure